Garry Johns (born 28 October 1964) is a former Australian rules footballer who played with Geelong in the Victorian Football League (VFL).

Johns, originally a Barwon player, represented Geelong in Under 19s football before breaking into the senior side in the 1984 VFL season. He debuted in Geelong's round five win over St Kilda at Moorabbin Oval and made his only other league appearance the following week, against Melbourne at the Melbourne Cricket Ground.

References

1964 births
Australian rules footballers from Victoria (Australia)
Geelong Football Club players
Barwon Football Club players
Living people